Margaret Ann Uyehara (born 1958) was an American diplomat whose last posting, prior to retirement, was as the United States Ambassador to Montenegro. She was nominated by President Barack Obama on July 9, 2014, and confirmed by the Senate in December 2014.

Early life and education
Uyehara grew up in Berea, Ohio, the daughter of Kenneth E. Yohner and Peggy L. Bush Yohner.
She was an undergraduate at Kalamazoo College in Michigan and graduated in 1981 with a Bachelor of Arts in political science. She later studied at the Edmund A. Walsh School of Foreign Service at Georgetown University

Career
After joining the Foreign Service, Uyehara served in Bamako, London, Manila,  and Tokyo. She became liaison to the National Security Council for the 50th anniversary of the NATO summit. From 1999 to 2002, Uyehara was a supervisory general services officer at the U.S. embassy in Jakarta, Indonesia.

Uyehara was assigned in 2006 to Kyiv, Ukraine, as management counselor at the U.S. embassy. In 2008 she was named as director of the Regional Support Center at the U.S. Consulate in Frankfurt, Germany. In 2010 she became a management counselor in Vienna, Austria.

When she was nominated to become a U.S. ambassador, she was serving in Washington, D.C. as executive director of the Bureaus of European and Eurasian Affairs and International Organization Affairs.

Personal
Uyehara's husband, Michael, is also a Foreign Service Officer, they have three sons and two daughters. In addition to English, Uyehara speaks German, French, Ukrainian and Japanese.

See also

List of ambassadors of the United States

References

External links

1958 births
Ambassadors of the United States to Montenegro
American women ambassadors
Walsh School of Foreign Service alumni
Kalamazoo College alumni
Living people
Obama administration personnel
United States Foreign Service personnel
21st-century American women